The 1923 Fresno State Bulldogs football team represented Fresno State Normal School—now known as California State University, Fresno—during the 1923 college football season.

Fresno State competed in the California Coast Conference (CCC) from 1922 to 1924. The 1923 team was led by head coach Arthur W. Jones in his third year at the helm. They finished as co-champion of the CCC, with a record of seven wins and two losses (7–2, 3–0 CCC). The Bulldogs outscored their opponents 211–108 for the season.

At the end of the season, the champion of the CCC North Division (Pacific) was to meet the champion of the CCC South Division (Fresno State) for the conference championship. However, the two teams could not agree on a site and the game was never played.

Schedule

Notes

References

Fresno State
Fresno State Bulldogs football seasons
California Coast Conference football champion seasons
Fresno State Bulldogs football